Brackenridgia heroldi is a species of woodlouse in the family Trichoniscidae. It is found in North America.

References

Isopoda
Articles created by Qbugbot
Crustaceans described in 1932